An election to the Carmarthenshire County Council was held on 13 April 1967. It was preceded by the 1964 election and followed by the 1970 election.

Overview of the result

The politics of the county had been transformed following the victory of Gwynfor Evans at the Carmarthen by-election in the previous year. This led to an increased number of Plaid Cymru candidates although they had limited success. The party polled well in several Llanelli wards. Another feature was the appearance of Liberal candidates for the first time for many years.

After a series of elections where Labour strengthened their majority on the Council the party suffered a number of losses and a majority of the elected councillors were Independents. The Labour losses included Douglas Hughes, leader of the Council and a member since 1928.

Boundary changes

There were no boundary changes at this election.

Retiring aldermen

A number of retiring Labour councillors stood down to allow retiring aldermen to be returned unopposed.

Unopposed returns

A number of members were again returned unopposed, but these were fewer in number than at most post-war elections.

Contested elections

Of the contests that took place, the most notable were in Llanelli town where the leader of the authority, Alderman Douglas Hughes ( a member since 1928) and his wife Alderman Loti Rhys Hughes (a member since 1946) were both defeated. Another long-serving member. Alderman Emrys Aubrey, only narrowly held his seat at Westfa. Labour lost seats at Burry Port to the Independents and at Kidwelly and Pembrey to Plaid Cymru.

Within the Carmarthen parliamentary constituency, Plaid Cymru won no seats but stood for the first time at Quarter Bach and both Llandybie seats, polling well in each instance.

Summary of results

59 councillors were elected.

Ward results

Abergwili

Ammanford No.1

Ammanford No.2

Berwick

Burry Port East

Burry Port West

Caio

Carmarthen Division 1

Carmarthen Division 2

Carmarthen Division 3

Cenarth

Cilycwm

Conwil

Cwmamman

Felinfoel

Hengoed

Kidwelly

Laugharne

Llanarthney

Llanboidy

Llandebie North

Llandebie South

Llandilo Rural

Llandilo Urban

Llandovery

Llandyssilio

Llanedy

Llanegwad

Llanelly Division.1

Llanelly Division 2

Llanelly Division 3

Llanelly Division 4

Llanelly Division 5

Llanelly Division 6

Llanelly Division 7

Llanelly Division 8

Llanelly Division 9

Llanfihangel Aberbythych

Llanfihangel-ar-Arth

Llangadog

Llangeler

Llangendeirne

Llangennech

Llangunnor

Llanon

Llansawel

Llanstephan

Llanybyther

Myddfai

Pembrey

Pontyberem

Quarter Bach

Rhydcymerau

St Clears

St Ishmaels

Trelech

Trimsaran

Westfa

Whitland

Election of aldermen

In addition to the 59 councillors the council consisted of 19 county aldermen. Aldermen were elected by the council, and served a six-year term. Following the elections, the majority of the aldermanic seats were taken by Labour.

References

Carmarthenshire County Council elections
Carmarthenshire